Peter Bendix (born August 1985) is an American professional baseball front office executive. He is the general manager for the Tampa Bay Rays of Major League Baseball.

Career
Bendix attended Tufts University, graduating in 2008. He took a course on sabermetrics at Tufts and his research project resulted in two offers for internships. He joined the Rays as an intern in 2009. The Rays promoted Bendix to vice president in 2019, and by 2020 his title was vice president of baseball development. Bendix was named general manager of the Rays on December 16, 2021, succeeding Erik Neander, who had been promoted to  president of baseball operations.

Bendix is originally from Cleveland, and lives in St. Petersburg, Florida.

References

Living people
Tampa Bay Rays executives
Major League Baseball general managers
Year of birth missing (living people)
Tufts University alumni
Sportspeople from Cleveland
1985 births